Raymond Michael ‘Mike’ Gaze FRS (22 June 1927—11 September 2012) was a British neuroscientist who pioneered electrophysiological recording techniques for investigating how nerve connections form, specifically with a focus on the eye-brain connection.
He was elected Fellow of the Royal Society of Edinburgh in 1964, of the Royal Society in 1972.

In 1986 he was made an Honorary Professor at the University of Edinburgh, where he had served within the physiology department at different stages of his career.

He served as Editor for the journal Development from 1976 to 1988.

References

1927 births

2012 deaths